The discography of Sneaky Sound System, an Australian dance music group consists of three studio albums, two compilation albums, a remix album, nineteen singles and twenty-one music videos. The group formed in 2001, and released their first remix album, Other Peoples Music, in 2003 through Sony Music Australia.

After setting up their own record label, Whack Records, Sneaky Sound System released their self-titled debut studio album in 2006. The album spawned the hit singles "Pictures" and "UFO". It peaked at number five on the ARIA Albums Chart, and was certified triple platinum by the Australian Recording Industry Association (ARIA). The album earned the group seven nominations at the 2007 ARIA Music Awards, winning the awards for "Breakthrough Artist Album" and "Best Dance Release". In 2008, Sneaky Sound System released their second studio album, 2, which debuted at number one ARIA Albums Chart. Its lead single, "Kansas City", peaked at number fourteen on the ARIA Singles Chart and was certified gold.

In 2009, the group collaborated with Dutch DJ Tiësto on the track "I Will Be Here" for his fourth studio album, Kaleidoscope. The song reached the top fifty on the UK Singles Chart, and top forty on the Netherlands' Single Top 100 chart. Later that year, member Daimon Downey parted ways with the group to pursue other interests, leaving Angus McDonald and Connie Mitchell as the remaining members. In 2011, Sneaky Sound System signed with major record label, Modular Recordings. Their third studio album, From Here to Anywhere, was released on 7 October 2011. Its lead single, "We Love", was released on 27 May 2011.

Albums

Studio albums

Remix albums

Compilation albums

Extended plays

Singles

Other appearances

Music videos

See also
Whack Records discography

References

External links 
 
 Official Sneaky Sound System YouTube

Discography
Discographies of Australian artists
Pop music group discographies